Milan Milovanović (Cyrillic: Милан Миловановић; 19 October 1876, Kruševac – 15 August 1946, Belgrade) was a Serbian Impressionist painter and art teacher.

Biography 
The following year, he began taking lessons with Anton Ažbe in Munich and, shortly after, enrolled at the Academy of Fine Arts where he initially studied with Karl Raupp, then Ludwig von Herterich and Carl von Marr. After graduating in 1902, he spent four years studying and working in Paris, beginning at the Académie Colarossi, then at the École nationale supérieure des Beaux-Arts, where he worked with Léon Bonnat and Luc-Olivier Merson.   

Upon returning to Belgrade, he received a commission from the Ministry of Foreign Affairs to study Orthodox monasteries in Serbia, Macedonia and Mount Athos. In 1904 in Kragujevac, he also assisted Živko Jugović.
His art in those areas inspired him to paint works with much light, mostly depicting architecture in natural settings. His painting of the Stone Bridge in Skopje is one of the first examples of Serbian Impressionism.

During World War I, he served in the Royal Serbian Army; painting mostly scenes with soldiers and portraits of officers. After a serious illness in 1915, he was sent to Italy for recovery and resumed his usual themes. During that period, and immediately after, he lived in Rome, Southern France and Dubrovnik. 

His output of paintings decreased dramatically after 1920, but he did restorative work on frescoes and wrote some occasional art criticism. 

He was married to Olga Mišić (1886–1977), the daughter of Field Marshal Živojin Mišić. He is the maternal uncle of architect Milica Čolak-Antić Krstić.

Selected paintings

See also
 Mihailo Milovanović
 List of painters from Serbia
 War artist

Further reading 
 
 Vera Ristić, Milan Milanović, 1876–1946, National Museum Belgrade, 1986

References

External links 
 
 Biography and paintings @ Riznica Srpska
 Brief biography @ ARTE

1876 births
1946 deaths
Serbian painters
Serbian Impressionist painters
People from Kruševac